Mikhail Olegovich Smirnov (born 3 June 1990) is a Russian professional footballer. He plays for FC Fakel Voronezh.

Club career
He made his Russian Premier League debut on 20 August 2011 for FC Amkar Perm in a game against FC Rubin Kazan.

Career statistics

External links

References

1990 births
Footballers from Saint Petersburg
Living people
Russian footballers
Association football defenders
FC Zenit Saint Petersburg players
FC Amkar Perm players
FC Neftekhimik Nizhnekamsk players
FC Tosno players
FC Kuban Krasnodar players
FC Sibir Novosibirsk players
FC Fakel Voronezh players
Russian Premier League players
Russian First League players